George Boland (6 October 1902–1977) was an English footballer who played in the Football League for Crewe Alexandra,  Fulham, Gateshead, Hartlepools United and Reading.

References

1902 births
1977 deaths
English footballers
Association football forwards
English Football League players
Hartlepool United F.C. players
Reading F.C. players
Fulham F.C. players
Gateshead A.F.C. players
Crewe Alexandra F.C. players
Walker Celtic F.C. players